A blazer is a type of jacket resembling a suit jacket, but cut more casually. A blazer is generally distinguished from a sport coat as a more formal garment and tailored from solid colour fabrics. Blazers often have naval-style metal buttons to reflect their origin as jackets worn by boating club members.

A blazer's cloth is usually durable, as it is intended as outdoor wear. Blazers are often part of a uniform that denotes, for example, an airline's employees, pupils of a particular school, members of sports clubs, or sportsmen and women on a particular team.

Wear

Blazers are worn with a wide variety of clothes, ranging from a dress shirt and necktie to an open-necked polo shirt, or even just a plain T-shirt. They are seen with trousers of all colours and fabrics, from the classic white cotton or linen, to grey flannel, to brown or beige chinos, and also jeans.

A fitted, classically cut, double-breasted navy blue blazer with navy-style buttons is a popular design and sometimes referred to as a "reefer" blazer. Particularly in North America and the United Kingdom, it is now frequently used in business casual attire.

Blazers, in a wide range of colours, are worn as part of school uniforms by many schools across the Commonwealth, and are still daily wear for most uniformed pupils in Britain, Ireland, Australia, New Zealand and South Africa. These are blazers in the traditional sense: single-breasted, and often of bright colours or with piping. This style is also worn by some boat clubs, such as those in Cambridge or Oxford, with the piped version used only on special occasions such as a boat club dinner. In this case, the piping is in college colours, and college buttons are worn. This traditional style can be seen in many films set in the Edwardian era, such as Kind Hearts and Coronets.

Where the blazer is part of the dress of a school, college, sports club, or armed service regimental association (veterans' organization), it is normal for a badge to be sewn to the breast pocket. In schools, this badge may vary according to the pupil's standing in the school: being a member of the junior or senior school, being a prefect, or having been awarded colours in recognition of particular achievement in some academic or sporting field. In the Commonwealth, many regimental associations wear "regimental blazers" which also sport a similar badge on the breast pocket, usually in the form of a wire badge, and sometimes also regimental blazer buttons.

In the British army, officers do not normally wear badges on their blazers (or boating jackets). Two regimental blazers will rarely be the same, as they are sourced from different civilian suppliers and are not issued by any authority. This results from the fact that the members of the association are no longer serving personnel, but civilians, though still retaining the bond that the badge represents. The standard colour is navy blue, although in some associations different colours are worn, such as rifle green for the associations of rifle regiments.

Blazers, once commonly worn playing or attending traditional "gentlemen's sports", persist in only some games now, such as occasional use by tennis players, or in cricket, where in professional matches, such as international test matches, it is considered customary for the captain to wear a blazer with the team's logo or national coat of arms on the breast pocket – at least during the coin toss at the beginning of the match.

Two sporting events where blazers signify victory are the Congressional Cup Regatta, at the Long Beach Yacht Club, and the Masters golf tournament, held in Augusta, Georgia. The former event awards a crimson blazer to the  winner of the regatta, while the latter awards a green blazer to the winner of the Masters.

History
The sartorial term blazer originated with the red "blazers" of the Lady Margaret Boat Club (1825), the rowing club of St. John's College, Cambridge. The Lady Margaret club jackets were termed blazers because of the bright red cloth, and the term survived the original red coat. Walter Wren, a writer to the London Daily News (22 August 1889) commented that "In your article of to-day … you speak of 'a striped red and black blazer', 'the blazer', also of 'the pale toned' ones … A blazer is the red flannel boating jacket worn by the Lady Margaret, St. John's College, Cambridge, Boat Club. When I was at Cambridge it meant that and nothing else. It seems from your article that a blazer now means a coloured flannel jacket, whether for cricket, tennis, boating, or seaside wear." 

These early blazers were like later sports jackets, but this term has never referred to blazers, instead describing jackets derived from the later innovation of wearing odd jackets for land-based sports. Assertions that the name is derived from HMS Blazer are not borne out by contemporary sources, although it is reported that before the standardization of uniform in the Royal Navy, the crew of HMS Blazer wore "striped blue and white jackets", apparently in response to the sailors of HMS Harlequin being turned out in harlequin suits. As late as 1837 the gig's crew of HMS Blazer were dressed by their Captain in jackets of blue and white stripes and it is from this that the word blazer, meaning a striped jacket, has entered the language.

The reefer jacket was of naval origin, and described the short double-breasted jacket worn by sailors in harsh weather, when they performed duties such as reefing the sails. It is descendants of this which are now commonly described by the term blazer. Originally with black horn buttons, these jackets evolved to the modern dark blazer, now single as well as double breasted, and with metallic buttons.

Striped blazers became popular among British Mods in the early 1960s, and again during the Mod revival of the late 1970s – particularly in three-colour thick/thin stripe combinations, with three-button single-breasted front, five- or six-inch side or centre vents, and cuffs with multiple buttons. Various photos from 1964 and 1965 show London mods in boating blazers. Photos of mod icons The Who from 1964 (as the High Numbers) variously show Pete Townshend, Keith Moon and John Entwistle wearing boating blazers. Another mod band, Small Faces, and other bands liked by mods – such as The Rolling Stones, The Beatles, The Kinks, Georgie Fame and the Blue Flames, The Animals, The Yardbirds, The Moody Blues and The Troggs – had band members wearing striped blazers/boating jackets, or later, brightly coloured blazers with wide white or other light edging. These later blazers often had non-metal buttons, sometimes in the same colour as the edging. The earlier style of striped blazers can be seen in the film Quadrophenia. The later, bright, style of blazer was affectionately adopted by Austin Powers as part of his Swinging-London look.

By the late 2000s the blazer had been adopted as a popular fashion trend amongst women, often having shorter lengths, rolled-up sleeves, various lapels and bright colours.

See also
Sport coat
Suit

References

External links
 

Lounge jackets